Addison W. Merrill (May 30, 1842 – November 15, 1920) was a member of the Wisconsin State Assembly.

Biography
Merrill was born on May 30, 1842, in Lowell, Massachusetts. He later resided in Princeton, Wisconsin and became a farmer.

During the American Civil War, Merrill served with the 18th Wisconsin Volunteer Infantry Regiment of the Union Army. Conflicts he participated in include the Battle of Jackson, Mississippi, Battle of Champion Hill and the Siege of Vicksburg. Merrill died at home in Alma Center, Wisconsin on November 15, 1920.

Political career
Merrill was elected to the Assembly in 1896. Additionally, he was a member of the town board (similar to city council) of Garden Valley, Wisconsin and of the board of supervisors of Jackson County, Wisconsin. He was a Republican.

References

Politicians from Lowell, Massachusetts
People from Alma Center, Wisconsin
Republican Party members of the Wisconsin State Assembly
Wisconsin city council members
County supervisors in Wisconsin
People of Wisconsin in the American Civil War
Union Army soldiers
Farmers from Wisconsin
1842 births
1920 deaths
People from Princeton, Wisconsin